Parliamentary elections were held in Guatemala in December 1929 in order to elect half of the legislature. 33 of the 39 deputies elected were supporters of President Lázaro Chacón González.

References

Elections in Guatemala
Guatemala
1929 in Guatemala
Election and referendum articles with incomplete results